Azé is the name of the following communes in France:

 Azé, Loir-et-Cher, in the Loir-et-Cher department
 Azé, Mayenne, in the Mayenne department
 Azé, Saône-et-Loire, in the Saône-et-Loire department

See also 
 Aze (disambiguation)
 Azay (disambiguation)